The voiced retroflex click is a rare click consonant. There is no symbol for it in the International Phonetic Alphabet.

Features

Features of the voiced retroflex click:

Occurrence
The voiced retroflex click is only confirmed from a single language, Central !Kung.

Notes

Click consonants
Retroflex consonants
Central consonants
Voiced oral consonants